The Outfit or Outfit may refer to:

Arts and entertainment
The Outfit (1973 film), a crime film starring Robert Duvall
The Outfit (2022 film), an American crime drama film
The Outfit (video game), a game for the Xbox 360 console
Outfit, a term used in the PlanetSide 2 game, referring to a gaming group, or clan, within the game
The Outfit, a graphic novel by Darwyn Cooke
The Outfit, a novel in the Parker series by Donald E. Westlake, writing as Richard Stark
"Outfit", a song by the Drive By Truckers on the album Decoration Day
The Outfit, a criminal organization in the television series, Viper

Other uses
Outfit (retailer), a chain of out-of-town clothing stores in the UK
Outfit, a crime syndicate or other organization
The Outfit, alternate name for the Chicago Outfit crime syndicate in the US